Jennie Marshall (born December 21, 1960) is an American rower. She competed in the women's quadruple sculls event at the 1988 Summer Olympics.

References

External links
 

1960 births
Living people
American female rowers
Olympic rowers of the United States
Rowers at the 1988 Summer Olympics
People from Cooperstown, New York
Pan American Games medalists in rowing
Pan American Games silver medalists for the United States
Rowers at the 1987 Pan American Games
Medalists at the 1987 Pan American Games
21st-century American women